Fountainville is an unincorporated community in Bucks County, Pennsylvania, United States. Fountainville is located at the intersection of Pennsylvania Route 313 and Ferry Road at the tripoint of Doylestown, New Britain, and Plumstead townships.

References

Unincorporated communities in Bucks County, Pennsylvania
Unincorporated communities in Pennsylvania